The Limestone Way is a waymarked long-distance footpath in Derbyshire, England. It runs for  through the White Peak of the Peak District National Park, from Castleton south to Rocester over the county boundary into Staffordshire. The trail is named for the limestone scenery along its route. It was devised by Brian Spencer of Matlock Rotary Club and developed and opened in 1986 by the West Derbyshire District Council (which became Derbyshire Dales District Council in 1987). It originally ran to Matlock, but was extended to its current, longer route in 1992 to join up with the Staffordshire Way.

The route
From Castleton, the route runs up Cave Dale, past the village of Peak Forest, down Hay Dale (shared with the Peak District Boundary Walk) and along Peter Dale. It then runs parallel to Monk's Dale and through the village of Millers Dale (passing under the viaduct which carries the Monsal Trail and crossing the River Wye).

It then crosses the A6 near the Waterloo Inn and over Taddington Moor. The trail follows old miners' tracks through the villages of Flagg and Monyash, across Cales Dale and past Youlgreave along the River Bradford through Bradford Dale. The route then continues across Harthill Moor (past the rock outcrops of Robin Hood's Stride and Cratcliffe Rocks), following the ancient Portway track past the village of Elton, around Winster and Bonsall and through Grangemill (across the Via Gellia road), after which it crosses the Midshires Way and the High Peak Trail. The trail then passes north of Brassington, past Rainster Rocks and runs through the ancient hamlet of Ballidon. The route goes into the village of Parwich and then crosses the Tissington Trail before running through Tissington itself and onto Thorpe. 

The trail crosses into Staffordshire over the River Dove at Coldwall Bridge and then down into Dovedale at Ellastone on its approach to the Roman settlement of Rocester.

Sights 
The Limestone Way passes through a historic landscape with prehistoric monuments, Roman sites and centuries of industrial heritage:

 Peveril Castle ruins at Castleton
 Route of Batham Gate Roman road
 Hay Dale, part of Derbyshire Dales National Nature Reserve
 Twin railway viaducts at Millers Dale railway station
 Wye Valley SSSI (Site of Special Scientific Interest)
 Five Wells chambered tomb on Taddington Moor
 One Ash Grange, established by the Roche Abbey monks in 1147
 Lomberdale Hall at Youlgreave, home of local Victorian antiquarian Thomas Bateman
 Nine Stones Close, Bronze Age stone circle
 Robin Hood's Stride gristone outcrop and pinnacles
 Cratcliffe Rocks with its hermit cave
 View of Carsington Water
 Medieval settlement and field system of Ballidon, with its Norman chapel
Tissington Hall, historic Jacobean home of the FitzHerbert family
 Civil War redoubt (military earthwork defence) at Tissington
 Coldwall Bridge over the River Dove
 Ellastone Bridge over the River Dove

Access 
Train stations: Matlock, Cromford.

Spurs link to Bonsall and onto Matlock (along the old route of the path) and from Thorpe to Ashbourne.

Details of connecting routes may be found on the Limestone Way page of the Long Distance Walkers' Association website.

The official guidebook is the Limestone Way Walker's Guide, published by Derbyshire Dales District Council.

The route is marked on Ordance Survey maps and is covered by three OS Explorer maps:

 OL1 – The Peak District (Dark Peak)
 OL24 – The Peak District (White Peak)
 259 – Derby

References

Peak District
Footpaths in Derbyshire
Footpaths in Staffordshire
Long-distance footpaths in England